Astarita may refer to:

 Gennaro Astarita, Italian composer
 Giuseppe Astarita, Italian architect 
 Tony Astarita, Italian singer
 Astarita Stakes, American non-graded Thoroughbred horse race